Amazing Detective Di Renjie, also known as Shen Tan Di Renjie and Wu Chao Mi An, is a Chinese television series based on gong'an detective stories related to Di Renjie, a Tang dynasty magistrate and statesman. Written and directed by Qian Yanqiu, the series starred Liang Guanhua as the titular protagonist, and was first broadcast on CCTV-8 on 6 August 2004. The series was followed by three sequels: Amazing Detective Di Renjie 2 (2006), Amazing Detective Di Renjie 3 (2008), and Mad Detective Di Renjie (2010).

Plot
The plot is divided into three parts as follows:
 Shi Tuan Jing Hun (使团惊魂), covering episodes 1 to 13.
 Lan Shan Ji (蓝杉记), covering episodes 14 to 23.
 Di Xue Xiong Ying (滴血雄鹰), covering episodes 24 to 30.

Cast
 Liang Guanhua as Di Renjie
 Zhang Zijian as Li Yuanfang
 Lü Zhong as Wu Zetian
 Zhu Yanping as Hu Jinghui
 Xu Qian as Zeng Tai
 Diana Pang as Li Qingxia (Jin Mulan)
 Yan Yansheng as Liu Jin
 Jiang Xin as Fang Yingyu (Xiaohong)
 Xu Xiaobei as Ilterish Qaghan
 Li Shilong as Liu Chali
 Xu Feilian as Liu Chuanlin
 Liu Shuang as Princess Taiping

Characters in the series

External links
  Amazing Detective Di Renjie (Season 1) on Sina.com

2004 Chinese television series debuts
Television series set in the Zhou dynasty (690–705)
Judge Dee
Gong'an television series
Mandarin-language television shows
Cultural depictions of Wu Zetian
Cultural depictions of Di Renjie
Television series set in the 7th century